Gugah (also Romanized as Gūgāh; also known as Goga) is a village in Rahimabad Rural District, Rahimabad District, Rudsar County, Gilan Province, Iran. At the 2006 census, its population was 49, in 12 families.

References 

Populated places in Rudsar County